Stigmella tranocrossa is a moth of the family Nepticulidae. It is found Hokkaido in Japan and the Russian Far East (Primorsky Krai).

There are probably two or more generations per year since adults occur in July from September to October.

The larvae feed on Populus nigra. They mine the leaves of their host plant. The mine consists of a gallery, usually running along a vein for some distance. The frass is concentrated in a thin and broken-linear line. The mine widens in the later part. Here, convolutions are often so contorted that they form a false blotch.

External links
Japanese Species Of The Genus Stigmella (Nepticulidae: Lepidoptera)

Nepticulidae
Moths of Japan
Moths of Asia
Moths described in 1985